Adam Michael Shankman (born November 27, 1964) is an American film director, producer, writer, dancer, author, actor, and choreographer. He was a permanent judge on seasons 6–7 of the television program So You Think You Can Dance. He began his professional career in musical theater, and was a dancer in music videos for Paula Abdul and Janet Jackson. Shankman has choreographed dozens of films and directed several feature-length films, including A Walk to Remember, Bringing Down the House, The Pacifier, and the musicals Hairspray and Disenchanted.

His company, Offspring Entertainment (which he co-owns with his sister) produces films and television for various studios and networks.

Shankman is also currently co-writing young adult novels for Simon & Schuster imprint Atheneum Books for Young Readers. The books, co-written with author Laura Lee Sullivan, follow the story of rags to riches Lucille O'Malley as she becomes Hollywood's "it girl", navigating a murder mystery and meeting her match, Frederick van der Waals.

Early life
Shankman was born in Los Angeles to an upper-middle-class Jewish family. He is the son of Phyllis (née Perper), a licensed practitioner in Gestalt therapy, and Ned Shankman, an entertainment lawyer and manager for such acts as Barry White, the American band X, and Sister Sledge. His sister Jennifer was born when Shankman was four years old. He attended Palisades High School before attending Juilliard School.

Early career
After graduating from Palisades, Shankman was a performing intern and junior company member of the prestigious Children's Theatre Company in Minneapolis. Having been accepted for both dancing and acting at Juilliard, he chose dance as his major without having any previous formal training.  He dropped out of college to dance in musical theater and at nineteen he was cast in his first professional show, West Side Story, at the esteemed Michigan Opera Theater.

Shankman moved back to Los Angeles and started dancing in music videos. He was a dancer in Janet Jackson's "Alright" video, as well as in an MC Skat Kat video with Paula Abdul. Shankman broke into professional choreography in a 1989 music video for rapper MC Shan with director Julien Temple. When the hired choreographer fell through, Shankman lied and said that he had done choreography for Janet Jackson and Paula Abdul. He was hired on the spot without his story being verified. As a choreographer, he worked with acts including Tony! Toni! Toné!, The Time, Whitney Houston and Aaron Neville. In 1996 he won a Bob Fosse Award for Best Choreography in a Commercial. On television, he was a go-to choreographer on Friends and The Ellen DeGeneres Show. He served as a choreographer and dance consultant on dozens of movies including Addams Family Values, Catch Me If You Can, George of the Jungle and Boogie Nights.

In 1998 Shankman wrote and directed Cosmo's Tale, a non-dialogue short film that appeared at the Sundance Film Festival. Following the short, his sister, Jennifer Gibgot, asked him to read a script that she had already set up with Fine Line Features, entitled The Wedding Planner. He liked the script and this led to a meeting with execs. He was hired for the job of director ten minutes into the meeting. The movie eventually went to Columbia Pictures and was a box office success.

Directing career

Following The Wedding Planner, Shankman went on to direct seven more studio films: A Walk to Remember, Cheaper by the Dozen 2, Bringing Down the House, The Pacifier, the 2007 award-winning film Hairspray, Walt Disney Studios Motion Pictures' Bedtime Stories, and the movie based on the musical of the same name, Rock of Ages. In 2019 he directed What Men Want, starring Taraji P. Henson for Paramount Pictures.

Shankman has been confirmed to helm Walt Disney Pictures' Disenchanted, the sequel to Enchanted, starring Amy Adams.

Shankman has directed commercial campaigns for Macy's, Marshalls and Schick, as well as primetime television pilots and shows, including Being Mary Jane, Glee, AJ and the Queen, Step Up: High Water and Modern Family. He has directed several shorts for Funny or Die, including "Prop 8 - The Musical" starring Jack Black and written by composer Marc Shaiman. According to Time magazine, "Prop 8 - The Musical" was Marc Shaiman's attempt to pick apart the anti-gay marriage lobby's logic. Lending support to the cause were actors Jack Black, John C. Reilly, Maya Rudolph, Craig Robinson, Neil Patrick Harris and Allison Janney.

In 2012, Shankman directed a dual campaign to attract young voters for Rock the Vote and Funny or Die.

In June 2017, he directed the pilot for Step Up, a gritty teen drama series produced by Lionsgate Television and YouTube Red.

Producing career

In addition to directing, Shankman has produced various studio films with his sister Jennifer Gibgot, through their company Offspring Entertainment. These include Touchstone Pictures' Step Up, which helped launch the careers of Channing Tatum and Jenna Dewan; Premonition, starring Sandra Bullock; Bedtime Stories for Walt Disney Studios Motion Pictures; 17 Again, starring Zac Efron; The Last Song, starring Miley Cyrus and Liam Hemsworth; and Going the Distance, starring Justin Long and Drew Barrymore. Shankman also served as producer of the Step Up franchise.

In 2009 Shankman produced Carrie Underwood: An All-Star Holiday Special, with Executive Producer Nigel Lythgoe.

With Bill Mechanic, Shankman was one of the two producers of the 82nd Academy Awards, which took place on March 7, 2010. The telecast earned a record 12 Primetime Emmy Award nominations, including two for Shankman, for Best Choreography and Co-Producing.

Offspring Entertainment, in addition to having several feature films on the development slate, has a deal with Warner Bros. Television and Warner Horizon, and is currently developing television series and events for both network and cable.

Adam Shankman serves as an executive producer on YouTube Premium and Lionsgate Television series Step Up. He also directed the pilot episode. The third season of the series aired on Starz Encore in 2022. In May 2021, Shankman announced that he would serve as an executive producer for Hocus Pocus 2.

Theater and stage
In August 2014, Shankman directed and choreographed a production of Hair at the Hollywood Bowl. Zach Woodlee assisted Shankman in choreography and Lon Hoyt served as music director. The show presented an all-star cast including Benjamin Walker as Berger, Kristen Bell as Sheila and Hunter Parrish as Claude. Other cast members included Sarah Hyland, Jenna Ushkowitz, Mario, Kevin Chamberlin, Beverly D'Angelo and Amber Riley. As is customary with the annual Bowl musicals, the Hair cast had fewer than 14 days to get the semi-staged show up and running.
Shankman and his team had the task of teaching dialogue, choreography, music and lyrics for over forty numbers to a cast of thirty, in just ten days before going on to dress rehearsals. The cast and crew had only two dress rehearsals before going live to a crowd of 11,000 people. The show garnered positive reviews, including one from BroadwayWorld.com: "Overall, Shankman's production of HAIR for the Hollywood Bowl is definitely a must-see event this weekend. Steeped in dazzling visuals, fun music, high-energy choreography, and a cast of talented, staggeringly gorgeous youngsters with giddiness coming out of every pore, this musical celebration of peace, love, and happiness deserves your attention."

In 2015, Warner Bros. Theater Ventures started developing a musical version of the 2009 movie 17 Again, which was directed by Burr Steers and produced by Shankman and Gibgot. The show was workshopped in New York's theater district, with a run planned for the near future. The musical is being produced by Warner Bros. Theater Ventures, Mark Kaufman and Adam Shankman.

So You Think You Can Dance
Shankman was a judge and choreographer on seasons 3–10 of the Fox Broadcasting reality show So You Think You Can Dance. He used the term "lyrical hip-hop" to describe the dance style associated with the choreography duo of Napoleon and Tabitha D'umo. The term is popularly credited to him, as reported in the May/June 2009 issue of Dance Spirit magazine.

Charitable work
Shankman has donated time and funds to numerous charitable and political foundations. He actively promotes charitable causes by producing live events and galas, utilizing social media, participating in PSAs, speaking engagements and personal appearances. These charities include AIDS Project Los Angeles, Mountains AIDS Foundation, Feeding America, the Elizabeth Taylor AIDS Foundation, Point Foundation, GO Campaign, Special Olympics and Motion Picture and Television Fund. He teaches classes and mentors students for Ghetto Film School and has appeared at events for Operation Smile.

Shankman serves on the board of The Trevor Project and co-founded the DizzyFeet Foundation with his friend Nigel Lythgoe. This was founded in 2009 to support, improve, and increase access to dance education in the United States by providing grants to after school dance and arts programs in low income areas and rewarding scholarships to talented dancers across the country. The foundation is the biggest supporter and trailblazer for National Dance Day, hosting various events every July across the United States.

Personal life
Shankman is gay.

He officiated the wedding of actors Freddie Prinze, Jr. and Sarah Michelle Gellar, a good friend of his with whom he worked while choreographing Buffy the Vampire Slayer. He got the Buffy job based on Gellar's recommendation to the show's creator, Joss Whedon.

Shankman danced on the Oscars telecast in 1990, and exactly 20 years later was producer and choreographer on the 82nd Oscars. At the 1990 Oscars, Shankman danced in the number "Under the Sea", where he met his best friend (a dancer in the same number), director and choreographer Anne Fletcher.

Filmography

Film

Producer
 Step Up (2006)
 Premonition (2007)
 Step Up 2: The Streets (2008)
 17 Again (2009)
 The Last Song  (2010)
 Step Up 3D (2010)
 Going the Distance (2010)
 Step Up Revolution (2012)
 Step Up: All In (2014)
 Status Update (2018)
 Step Up: Year of the Dance (2019)

Television

Producer
 The 82nd Annual Academy Awards (2010)

Acting credits

Choreographer

Video short

Other credits

References

External links

 
 Interview with The Advocate

1964 births
20th-century American male actors
21st-century American male actors
American choreographers
American male dancers
American male film actors
American television directors
Comedy film directors
Film directors from Los Angeles
Film producers from California
American gay actors
Jewish American male actors
LGBT dancers
LGBT film directors
LGBT television directors
LGBT theatre directors
LGBT Jews
LGBT people from California
Living people
Male actors from Los Angeles
21st-century American Jews
21st-century LGBT people